Kafir Kot or Kafirkot is an ancient Hindu Temple complex in the Dera Ismail Khan District of Khyber Pakhtunkhwa, Pakistan. It consists of the ruins of five temples and a large fort.

The remains of Sindhu Temple (and the nearby ruins of Mari) "are indications of the existence of a Hindu civilization of considerable importance and antiquity" according to a 1915 issue of the District Gazetteer of Mianwali.

Description
The ruin consists of two forts in the northwest of the district on small hills attached to the lower spurs of the Khasor Range and overlooking the Indus River near the Chashma Barrage. One lies a few miles south of Kundal and the other near Bilot.

According to the District Gazetteer of Mianwali:

Location
Bilot Fort is the second fort situated next to the town of Bilot Sharif and about 55 km north of Dera Ismail Khan in Pakistan. It was an ancient Hindu Fort with a famous temple inside its walls. The fort was destroyed by the Ghaznavids in the 11th century.

Museum collections
Sculptures and architectural components from the site have been dispersed to museums across Pakistan and the rest of the world. One of the largest collections from Kafir Kot outside Pakistan is in the British Museum.

See also 
 Hinduism in Khyber Pakhtunkhwa
 List of Hindu temples in Pakistan
 Hindu, Jain and Buddhist architectural heritage of Pakistan

References

External links
Site map of ruins - University of Pennsylvania.
Temples Along the Indus.

 

Dera Ismail Khan District
Archaeological sites in Pakistan
Archaeological sites in Khyber Pakhtunkhwa
Hindu temples in Khyber Pakhtunkhwa